= Éric Genetet =

French writer (born 1967)

Éric Genetet (born 1967) is a French writer. His published works include Solo, Le Fiancé de la lune, Et n’attendre personne and Tomber (winner of the prix Folire and the prix de la Ville de Belfort (2016).

He divides his time between Strasbourg and Paris.
